Panthera zdanskyi, also known as the Longdan tiger, is an extinct pantherine species that is seen as a close relative of the modern tiger. Fossils were excavated in northwestern China's Gansu province.

Etymology
Panthera zdanskyi was first named by Ji H. Mazák, Per Christiansen and Andrew C. Kitchener in 2011. The specific name honors the Austrian paleontologist Otto A. Zdansky for his contributions to the understanding of Neogene Chinese fossil carnivorans.

Description
The holotype of Panthera zdanskyi consists of a nearly complete skull and mandible stored at the Babiarz Institute of Paleontological Studies. It is the oldest known complete pantherine skull ever found, and indicates that the animal was about the size of a jaguar. The paratype comprises a rostrum, premaxilla and maxilla and much of the dentition, originally referred to Panthera palaeosinensis. It was collected in 2004 in the east slope of Longdan, south of Dongxiang Autonomous County in the Lower Pleistocene Equus layer, dating to the Gelasian stage of the earliest Pleistocene, about 2.55–2.16 million years ago.

Phylogeny
 
The cladogram below follows Mazák, Christiansen and Kitchener (2011).

See also
Panthera blytheae
Panthera gombaszoegensis
Panthera shawi
Panthera sondaica
Panthera youngi

References

External links 

zdanskyi
Fossil taxa described in 2011
zdanskyi
Pleistocene carnivorans
Pleistocene mammals of Asia